Michael Stephen Dempsey (born 29 November 1958) is an English musician and composer, who has played bass as a member of several post-punk and new wave bands, including the Cure and the Associates.

History

Early years
Dempsey was born on 29 November 1958 in Salisbury, Southern Rhodesia (now known as Harare, Zimbabwe); the son of Nancy and William. He moved to Salfords in Surrey, England in 1961, and attended Salfords County School from 1963 to 1970.

He then went to Notre Dame Middle School between 1970 and 1972, where he met Robert Smith, Marc Ceccagno and Lol Tolhurst. Here they first played music together as the Obelisk in April 1972, giving an end-of-year performance for their classmates. Although he is ordinarily known as a bass guitar player, Dempsey played guitar for The Obelisk's only known live performance, whereas one Alan Hill played bass.

He later attended Saint Wilfrid's Catholic Comprehensive School (1972–1976), and Crawley College from 1976 to 1978.

In January 1976 Dempsey became a co-founding member of Malice, along with Smith, Ceccagno, and others. The band also later featured Laurence Tolhurst, and Porl Thompson. They played only a few live shows in December of that same year.

Easy Cure and the Cure: 1977–1979
In 1977, Dempsey, Tolhurst, Smith and Thompson formed Easy Cure, who became known as the Cure following Thompson's departure in April 1978. Dempsey appeared as bassist on the Cure's singles "Killing an Arab" (1978) and "Boys Don't Cry" (1979) and on their 1979 studio album Three Imaginary Boys. Other than frontman Smith, Dempsey had the distinction of being the only other member of the Cure (besides Simon Gallup on the unreleased demo, "Violin Song") to sing lead vocals. He sang the cover version of the Jimi Hendrix song "Foxy Lady", which appears on Three Imaginary Boys. He made his final live performance as a member of the Cure on 15 October 1979 at London's Hammersmith Odeon on the last night of the Cure's tour in support of Siouxsie and the Banshees. In November of that year, however, the singles "Jumping Someone Else's Train" by the Cure and "I'm a Cult Hero"/"I Dig You" by Cure side-project Cult Hero were also released with Dempsey performing, respectively, bass and keyboards. The Cure's Three Imaginary Boys album and singles from 1978–1979 featuring Dempsey were later repackaged for the US market as the Boys Don't Cry album in 1980, and he appears on the band's early Peel Sessions between 1978 and 1979. In November 1979, he was fired of the band and replaced by Simon Gallup.

Post-Cure
In 1986, Dempsey appeared in the music video for a new version of "Boys Don't Cry". In 2004, the deluxe edition of Three Imaginary Boys was issued featuring a second disc of rare and previously unreleased material recorded between 1977 and 1979, which again feature Dempsey on bass. He also appears on some tracks on the deluxe edition of Seventeen Seconds (1980).

The Associates: 1979–1983
Upon leaving the Cure, Dempsey became the bassist for Scottish post-punk band the Associates, who (like the Cure) were signed to Fiction Records. He had already performed with the Associates prior to leaving the Cure, but made his debut as their new full-time bassist on 16 November 1979 at Eric's Club in Liverpool; the first night of the Future Pastimes Tour; a "Fiction Records Package" tour featuring the Cure, the Passions and the Associates. He remained the Associates' bassist from 1979 to 1983, appearing on the albums Fourth Drawer Down (1981) and Sulk (1982) along with a number of singles between 1980 and 1983. He also performed with the group on a series of radio sessions recorded for Radio 1's John Peel and David Jensen shows, which were later released in 2003 as the album Radio 1 Sessions Volume 1; 1981–83.

Post-Associates
The original group disbanded in 1983 following the departure of co-founder Alan Rankine, however frontman Billy Mackenzie continued to work under the name of Associates with various collaborators, including Dempsey at times. Dempsey has also continued to collaborate with Rankine. His replacement on bass during Associates' second phase was Roberto Soave, who has since appeared in several bands also featuring members of the Cure including Shelleyan Orphan, Presence and Babacar, as well as taking Gallup's place in the Cure for some live performances.

After MacKenzie's death in 1997, Dempsey was responsible for remastering and reissuing much of the band's early material as part of the V2 Records project, collaborating with MacKenzie's estate to ensure that his legacy was preserved. Dempsey has since then been responsible for making available archival Associates materials such as rare tracks and other media via his own media company.

Roxy Music – 1982 
Dempsey played bass in the video for English band Roxy Music's hit single "Avalon".

The Lotus Eaters: 1983–1985
In 1983 Dempsey became the bassist for Liverpool's then-recently formed new wave band the Lotus Eaters, replacing original bassist Phil Lucking. They signed to Arista Records and released their debut single "The First Picture of You" in June 1983 (reaching No. 15 in the UK charts), followed by the singles "You Don't Need Someone New" (August '83) and "Set Me Apart" (1984). The 1984 debut album No Sense of Sin followed with the single "Out On Your Own", and finally "It Hurts" in early 1985. Both Dempsey and founding member Jem Kelly left the group in 1985: co-founder Peter Coyle continued under the Lotus Eaters name for a short time live with replacement members whilst Kelly went on to reform his earlier band the Wild Swans.

Post-Lotus Eaters
In 1998, the Lotus Eaters released First Picture of You – BBC Sessions, a compilation of Radio 1 sessions recorded between 1982 and 1983 and live material from 1984 on which Dempsey played bass. Founding members Coyle and Kelly later reformed the Lotus Eaters in 2000 and released the album Slentspace, with a second album recorded and awaiting released in 2009: however Dempsey was no longer a member.

Kelly stated in a 2002 interview that "Michael Dempsey and I are working on an album and looking for French female singers. Do you know any? It's inspired by cinemas and film music – music to make the spirit soar and get you thinking of scripts for Art house movies"

In a 2004 interview with the Cure fansite A Pink Dream, Dempsey said that he had at one time been a collaborator on a project called Act, which he described as "a spin-off from Propaganda and the Lotus Eaters".

Animation
In 1998, Dempsey composed music for the animated TV series PB Bear and Friends. He also worked on several shorts, including films by the animator Gil Alkabetz, and animator Carolina Lopez for her graduate film Swan Song at what is now the University for the Creative Arts, Farnham.

Atom Heart Mother – 2008 
In 2008 Dempsey produced Pink Floyd's Atom Heart Mother concerts at the Cadogan Hall, London. The composer Ron Geesin performed with a full choir, band, and brass as well as an appearance from David Gilmour.

Collaborations with Lol Tolhurst
In 1990 Dempsey, Tolhurst and Gary Biddles (of Fools Dance) were recording demos together with a view to forming a new band following Tolhurst's departure from the Cure.  With the addition of keyboardist Chris Youdell (of Then Jerico) and drummer Alan Burgess the band emerged in 1991 as Presence with the singles "In Wonder" and "All I See". Dempsey received co-writing credit for "Amazed", a B-side from "All I See", but took a background role as a session bassist and did not appear in the band's photos or press. Porl Thompson also made guest appearances on guitar for some of these recordings, but by 1992 both Dempsey and Thompson were officially replaced by bassist Roberto Soave (formerly of Associates and Shelleyan Orphan) and guitarist Rob Steen respectively. Dempsey also received co-writing credits for another two tracks on the 1993 debut album Inside.

In 2004 Dempsey said that he still worked regularly with Tolhurst and that he had some contact with Thompson, but had not spoken to Smith in many years.  Tolhurst is also one of the artists associated with Dempsey's music and media publishing company.

In 2007 Dempsey also remixed Tolhurst's post-Presence project Levinhurst, contributing the "Imaginary Boy Mix" of the track "Never Going to Dream Again" to Levinhurst's The Grey EP (released in February 2007). Dempsey remixed some tracks from Levinhurst's second album House by the Sea (2007) and was co-writer and performer on their third album, Blue Star]' (2009). Levinhurst toured Europe in 2009 and 2010 with Dempsey playing bass.

 MDM Media 
Since the 1990s Dempsey has also gone on to work in audio digital restoration, remastering, licensing, media content consultancy and original soundtracks for film, television and other media. His clients have included Warner Music Group, Universal Music Group and V2 Records and he has his own company, MDM Media, specialising in these areas. He is also part of an affiliate company, BDM Music, whose other writers include Tolhurst, Rankine and many other musicians, composers and producers that Dempsey has worked with over the years. The company specialises in composing and licensing music for advertising.

Discography
The Cure
 Three Imaginary Boys (1979)
 Boys Don't Cry (1980)
 Standing on a Beach (1986)
 Greatest Hits (2001)
The Associates
 Fourth Drawer Down (1981)
 Sulk (1982)
The Lotus Eaters
 No Sense of Sin (1984)
Levinhurst
 Blue Star'' (2009)

References

External links
 
 
 

1958 births
Living people
The Associates (band) members
The Cure members
Levinhurst members
British alternative rock musicians
English new wave musicians
English rock bass guitarists
Male bass guitarists
People from Harare
The Lotus Eaters (band) members